Wick Hill is a suburb of Bracknell, in Berkshire, England.

Geography
In contrast to these areas Wick Hill was built as privately owned, largely detached, housing.

The area includes Wick Hill House, a residence of 19th-century explorer St. George Littledale, since converted to apartments. Other areas of housing are surrounded by the walls of former Edwardian residence built in 1835.

The suburb has a local nature reserve called Whitegrove Copse.

References

Bracknell